Alexander Nwora is a Nigerian basketball coach of the Nigerian national team D'Tigers, which he coached at the AfroBasket 2017.
He also been the head men's basketball coach at the Erie Community College since 1999.

Early life
He was born in the Eastern part of Nigeria. He started out as a basketball player.

Professional career

Cape Verde National team
He was once a coach of the Cape Verde National Basketball side. He coached the side for about six years, he led the team to the 2013 Afrobasket tournament where they  defeated the Nigerian national basketball team D'Tigers by 79 to 76 points.

Nigerian national basketball team
He led the Nigerian national basketball team to the 2017 FIBA Afrobasket tournament, after he was appointed as head coach of the male national basketball team D'Tigers by the Nigerian Basketball Federation.

Personal life
Nwora is married to Amy, an American who is a Professor of Occupational Therapy. They have four kids who play basketball.

During the 2018 FIBA World Cup qualifiers that took place in Lagos, Alex and his son Jordan became the first Nigerian father and son to represent a National team side at the same time.

References

Nigerian basketball coaches
Living people
Year of birth missing (living people)
People from Owerri
Sportspeople from Imo State